Saltburn is a railway station on the Tees Valley Line, which runs between  and Saltburn via . It is owned by Network Rail and managed by Northern Trains.

History
The station was opened by the Stockton and Darlington Railway as the terminus of their line from Redcar on 17 August 1861 (although the ornate station building was not finished until the following year). This meant the passenger trains from the town to Loftus and Whitby that started in 1875 had to reverse into and out of the terminus before regaining the correct direction at Saltburn West Junction. This line is still in operation today to serve the Skinningrove Steelworks and the Boulby potash mine, although passenger trains ceased in 1958.

In its heyday, the station had four platforms and a sizeable number of carriage sidings to handle the large quantities of excursion trains that ran there – these included services from as far away as Leeds and Blackpool. There was also a short siding extension (approximately ) from the main station to another platform at the rear of the railway-owned Zetland Hotel (opened in 1863) where passengers in first class carriages could disembark directly into their accommodation.

A 1974 remodelling scheme saw the station reduced in size with the two main platforms and signal box being taken out of use along with most of the sidings and one of the two running lines from West Junction.  Today both of the two surviving excursion bay platforms are used for scheduled services (though most trains use platform 1) but neither the main station building nor the Zetland Hotel is in rail-related use – the former having been converted into a photographic studio, cafe and various other retail outlets and the latter into luxury flats.

Facilities
It is unmanned, and has two acrylic glass passenger shelters, bench seating and an electronic information board. A self-service ticket machine has also been installed to allow intending passenger to buy tickets prior to travel or collect pre-paid tickets. Step-free access is available from the main entrance to both platforms.

Station facilities here were improved in Summer 2012. The package for this station included new waiting shelters, decorative planting schemes, renewed station signage, a digital information screen displaying live departures, and the installation of CCTV. The long-line Public Address system (PA) has been renewed and upgraded with pre-recorded train announcements.

Services

On Sundays, the station is served by an hourly Northern Trains service to Bishop Auckland and an hourly TransPennine Express to Manchester Airport.

Services are operated using ,  and  DMUs.

References

Sources

Binns, D. (1981), Railways Around Skipton, Wyvern Publications, Skipton.
Body, G. (1988), PSL Field Guides - Railways of the Eastern Region Volume 2, Patrick Stephens Ltd, Wellingborough,

External links
 
 

Railway stations in Redcar and Cleveland
DfT Category F1 stations
Former North Eastern Railway (UK) stations
Railway stations in Great Britain opened in 1861
Northern franchise railway stations
Railway stations served by TransPennine Express
1861 establishments in England
William Peachey railway stations
Saltburn-by-the-Sea